Luis Colina (born 29 June 1941) is a Colombian former sports shooter. He competed in the 25 metre pistol event at the 1972 Summer Olympics and finished with rank 40.

References

External links
 

1941 births
Living people
Colombian male sport shooters
Olympic shooters of Colombia
Shooters at the 1972 Summer Olympics
Place of birth missing (living people)
Pan American Games medalists in shooting
Pan American Games silver medalists for Colombia
Shooters at the 1983 Pan American Games
20th-century Colombian people
21st-century Colombian people
Medalists at the 1979 Pan American Games
Medalists at the 1983 Pan American Games
Medalists at the 1987 Pan American Games
Medalists at the 1991 Pan American Games